Nothris is a genus of moths in the family Gelechiidae.

Species
Nothris congressariella (Bruand, 1858)
Nothris hastata (Meyrick, 1918)
Nothris leuca Filipjev, 1928
Nothris lemniscellus (Zeller, 1839)
Nothris radiata (Staudinger, 1879)
Nothris sabulosella Rebel, 1935
Nothris sulcella Staudinger, 1859
Nothris verbascella (Denis & Schiffermuller, 1775)

Excluded species
Nothris mesophracta
Nothris ochracella Turati, 1926

Status unclear
Nothris umbrella (Denis & Schiffermüller, 1775), described as Tinea umbrella

References

Chelariini